Luis Garza Medina is a Roman Catholic priest of the Legion of Christ who previously served as its Vicar General and Territorial Director of North America. In a civil lawsuit that was later dropped without explanation, Garza was listed among the accused of alleged sexual abuse of teenage boy in the early 1990s. Following up on these accusations, the Legion of Christ carried out a canonical investigation entrusted to an independent investigator who concluded that "the accusations against Father Luis Garza were not credible".  He was therefore cleared of the accusation and it was declared that he should be "free from suspicion and should not be restricted in any way in the exercise of his priestly ministry".  Garza was named in the Pandora Papers, where it was reported that his family had $300 Million in trusts in New Zealand.

Biography
Garza was born and raised in Monterrey, Mexico.  He has a bachelor's degree in industrial engineering from Stanford University.  He entered the Legion of Christ in 1978.

Garza became Vicar General of the Legion from 1992. In that office Garza led the efforts to investigate charges of sexual misconduct brought against Legion founder Marcial Maciel although some allege he had known about the abuses for years and chose to cover them up.

Garza resigned from the post of Vicar General in 2011 in order to take up the role of Territorial Director for the United States and Canada.

His older brother Dionisio Garza Medina is  the CEO of Tenedora Topaz.  His younger sister Roberta Garza Medina is the editor of Milenio magazine in Mexico City.

Notes

External links
Regnum Christi announcement of Garza's appointment to head North American Region
Vatican Insider article on Garza's resignation
Jason Berry "How Father Maciel Built His Empire" National Catholic Reporter Apr 12, 2010

Mexican expatriates in the Philippines
Living people
Mexican Roman Catholic priests
Stanford University alumni
Clergy from Monterrey
Mexican expatriates in the United States
Year of birth missing (living people)